The 2012 German Masters (officially the 2012 PartyPoker.net German Masters) was a professional ranking snooker tournament that took place between 1–5 February 2012 at the Tempodrom in Berlin, Germany. This was the first time that PartyPoker.net sponsored the event.

Mike Dunn made the 79th official maximum break during his round 1 qualifying match against Kurt Maflin. This was Dunn's first 147 break. Stephen Hendry missed the final stage of a ranking event for the first time in 15 years after losing 1–5 to James Wattana in the final qualifying round.

Mark Williams was the defending champion, but he lost in the quarter-finals 3–5 against Stephen Lee.

Ronnie O'Sullivan won his 23rd ranking title by defeating Stephen Maguire 9–7 in the final.

Prize fund
The breakdown of prize money for this year is shown below: 

Winner: €50,000
Runner-up: €30,000
Semi-final: €15,000
Quarter-final: €9,000
Last 16: €6,000
Last 32: €3,750
Last 48: €1,500

Stage two highest break: €2,000
Total: €280,000

Wildcard round
These matches were played in Berlin on 1 February 2012.

Main draw

Final

Qualifying
These matches were held between 21 and 25 November 2011 at the World Snooker Academy, Sheffield, England. Matches were over 9 frames.

Preliminary round

Round 1

Round 2

Round 3

Century breaks

Qualifying stage centuries
 

 147  Mike Dunn
 143, 100, 100  Michael White
 137, 102  Jamie Jones
 137  Adam Duffy
 135  Ken Doherty
 133  Stuart Carrington
 131, 101  Liu Song
 126  David Gilbert
 124, 120  Jimmy White
 123  Liang Wenbo
 122  Passakorn Suwannawat
 121  Adam Wicheard
 120, 115  Ryan Day

 117, 100  Xiao Guodong
 116  Andy Hicks
 112, 108  Jamie Burnett
 112, 101  Mark Davis
 111, 107  Anthony Hamilton
 111  Mark Joyce
 110  Andrew Higginson
 109, 100  Yu Delu
 104  Anthony McGill
 103  Sam Craigie
 103  Joe Perry
 102  Paul Davison
 102  James Wattana

Televised stage centuries

 130, 128, 106, 100  Stephen Maguire
 129  Ali Carter
 128  Stuart Bingham
 128  Shaun Murphy
 123, 111, 110  Ronnie O'Sullivan
 113  Barry Hawkins
 111, 104  Mark Selby
 111  Judd Trump
 109  Peter Ebdon
 107  Mark Williams
 102  Mike Dunn
 102  Joe Perry
 102  Ricky Walden
 101  Stephen Lee
 100  Tom Ford

Gallery

References

External links 

German Masters 2012: Qualifs Day 1 pictures by MoniqueLimbos at Facebook
German Masters 2012: Qualifs Day 2 pictures by MoniqueLimbos at Facebook
German Masters 2012: Main Day 1 pictures by MoniqueLimbos at Facebook
German Masters 2012: Main Day 2 pictures by MoniqueLimbos at Facebook
German Masters 2012: Main Day 3 pictures by MoniqueLimbos at Facebook

2012
German Masters
Masters
Sports competitions in Berlin